All Saints' Church is an active English-speaking chaplaincy of the Church of England's Diocese in Europe - a part of the Anglican Communion - in Rome, Italy.

The church building is a Gothic revival red-brick construction, situated in the Via del Babuino, about 100 meters from the Spanish Steps. The  architect was George Edmund Street (1824–1881). It has a regular weekly schedule of masses and prayer services and is used, as well, for concerts. All Saints follows the high church tradition of Anglicanism, with a sung Eucharist being held weekly.

See also 
St Andrew's Church, Rome (Church of Scotland)
St Paul's Within the Walls, Rome (Episcopal, also by G. E. Street)

External links 
Official website

Protestant churches in Rome
Rome, All Saints Church
G. E. Street buildings
Churches of Rome (rione Campo Marzio)
Diocese in Europe